All by Myself is the 1987 debut album by American singer–songwriter Regina Belle. Released on June 1, 1987 by Columbia Records, The album features the hit singles "Show Me the Way", "So Many Tears", "How Could You Do It to Me", "Please Be Mine" and "You Got the Love".

The album peaked at number 85 on the Billboard 200 and number 14 on the Top R&B/Hip-Hop Albums chart. In 1987, Regina Belle recorded a duet with Peabo Bryson the song "Without You", the love theme from the film Leonard Part 6, however, "Without You" was not included on the 1987's release of All by Myself album.

In 2012, the album was remastered on CD and "Without You" was included at the end of the disc as a bonus track, however, was not the original song, but a "single mix". The original 1987 version of "Without You" was recorded only for Peabo Bryson album Positive, released in 1988.

Track listings

Personnel
Annette Hardeman, Charlene Holloway, Cynthia Biggs, Bobbette Jamerson, John C. Flucker, Linda Lawri Harold, Esther, Gloria and Gracie Ridgeway, Glenn Miller - backing vocals
Ron Jennings, Tony Santoro, Donald W. Lyle – guitars
Michael J. Powell – guitars, drum machine programming
Edward Roynesdal – keyboards, synthesizers, bass, drums
Dexter Wansel, Randy Cantor, David J. Spradley, Sir Dean Gant, Vernon D. Fails, Byron Williams – keyboards
Valerie Pinkston – keyboards, backing vocals
Doug Grigsby, David B. Washington – bass
Jim Salamone, Anthony Fortuna – drums
Daryl Burgee – drums, percussion
Pablo Batista, Paulinho Da Costa, Tamara Kornak, Nathan Ford, Jr. – percussion
Scott Mayo, Don Myrick – saxophone

Charts

References 

1987 debut albums
Regina Belle albums
Columbia Records albums
Albums produced by Michael J. Powell